The by-thirds 2015 Elmbridge Borough Council election took place on 7 May 2015 to elect members of Elmbridge Borough Council in England. This was on the same day as other local elections.

Wards
The electoral wards drawn under a typical 12-year national review have two or three councillors.  The Weybridge North and South, Hinchley Wood, Cobham Fairmile, Walton Ambleside and Weston Green wards form a two-member, lower population minority of six, four of which hold elections in two years in a row followed by two hiatus years, two of which hold elections in alternate years.  In 2015 of the 22 wards, 20 had one of their councillors up for election, Weybridge South and Fairmile holding elections in even-numbered years.

Results

Local Conservatives unseated two of the residents association representatives: for St Georges Hill and Molesey East wards of the United Kingdom.  The Liberal Democrats took a Conservative seat in Claygate ward.  The three winners join other fellow incumbents of their party in these wards reflecting in each case a lower percentage swing to their parties in these wards than seen in the election round of the year before.  The other seats were won by incumbents or replacement councillors of the same party where the incumbent retired.  The political breakdown gave a majority of 9 councillors for the Conservative party, a net rise of one, having gained two, lost one.

The nominal percentage change shown in the results below compares the performance of most of the same candidates as against a new round of incumbent councillors (the performance on party basis in the election of the previous year) as most of the unsuccessful candidates in 2014 stood again here (as in other councils) however this time against the new third of the councillors up for re-election so personal popularity of councillors may provide an additional factor for swings seen.  Similarly, the Borough Council compared the turnout to the previous year without a high turnout general election being the 2014 local government and European Parliament elections.

References

2015 English local elections
May 2015 events in the United Kingdom
2015
2010s in Surrey